Saint Oscar may refer to :
 Ansgar (801–865), Archbishop of Hamburg-Bremen 
 Óscar Romero (1917–1980), Archbishop of San Salvador